Joseph Francis Xavier Sheppard (October 5, 1905 — February 20, 1996) was a Canadian ice hockey player who played eight games in the National Hockey League with the Detroit Cougars during the 1927–28 season. Born in Montreal, Quebec, but grew up in Selkirk, Manitoba. He was the younger brother of Johnny Sheppard. The obituary in the Vancouver Sun issue date February 22, 1996 states he was born on October 5, 1905, not October 19, 1905.

Playing career
Sheppard mainly played in the American Hockey Association (AHA), spending six seasons there between 1926 and 1932. He signed with the Detroit Cougars on September 9, 1927. His NHL debut came on November 15 against the Pittsburgh Pirates, and he scored his first goal in that game. Sheppard played eight games with Detroit before being traded to the St. Paul Saints of the AHA on December 19, 1927. After his time in the AHA Sheppard would play five seasons split between the Western Canada Hockey League, North West Hockey League, and Pacific Coast Hockey League, retiring in 1937.

Post-playing career
After his hockey career, Sheppard worked as a real estate agent, however soon after the death of his wife in 1953, he quit his job and became homeless and addicted to alcohol, "bounc[ing] in and out of beer parlours and construction camps". In 1966, he was arrested and given a suspended sentence for begging on the streets of Vancouver. 

One Sheppard's sons, James Frank (Jim) Sheppard (born 1939) was the former chief executive officer of machinery company Finning, and forestry product company Canfor. He was also an economic advisor to British Columbia Premiers Gordon Campbell and Christy Clark.

Career statistics

Regular season and playoffs

References

Citations

Bibliography

External links

1905 births
1996 deaths
Canadian ice hockey left wingers
Detroit Cougars players
Detroit Greyhounds players
Edmonton Eskimos (ice hockey) players
Ice hockey people from Manitoba
People from Selkirk, Manitoba
St. Paul Saints (AHA) players
Tulsa Oilers (AHA) players
Vancouver Lions players